Dong'ou also known as Ouyue, was an ancient  kingdom in modern Wenzhou and Taizhou, Zhejiang Province, China. The realm of Dong'ou was given to Zou Yao by Emperor Gaozu of Han in 192 BC. During the Han campaigns against Minyue in 138 BC, the king of Dong'ou no longer wished to live in his realm after the incident, and had all his people moved into the Han dynasty.

References

Further reading

138 BC
191 BC
190s BC establishments
2nd-century BC disestablishments
2nd-century BC establishments
Former countries in Chinese history
History of Zhejiang
States and territories established in the 2nd century BC